Duccio Malagamba (born 1960) is an Italian architectural photographer.

Life and work
Malagamba was born in La Spezia, Italy.

In more than 25 years of professional experience he participated in several exhibitions, lectures, and juries, and four times has been awarded with “Lux” National Photography Prizes, granted by the Spanish Association of Professional Photographers. He collaborates with architects such as Alvaro Siza, Herzog & de Meuron, Rafael Moneo, EMBT, and Coop Himmelb(l)au, and his photographs are regularly featured in specialized magazines and publishing houses worldwide.

After graduating in Architecture cum laude from the Genoa University, he moved to Barcelona to begin his career as an architect. He soon joined the studio MBM (Martorell-Bohigas-Mackay) Arquitectos, where, among other responsibilities, he led the winning team for the “Un Progetto per Siena” international competition.
In 1989 he won a scholarship granted by the “CNR” (Italian National Research Centre) for a research on Spanish Contemporary Architecture. Carrying out the research he took up his youthful interest in photography and his images obtained general recognition. 
In 1991 he decided to devote himself entirely to architectural photography.

Along with his work as a photographer, Duccio Malagamba is the author of various articles on photography and architecture. From February 1995 to February 1996 he was appointed managing editor (Director Técnico) of the Spanish architecture and design magazine ‘Diseño Interior’. After the conversion of 'Diseño Interior' into a magazine mainly focused on interior and furniture design, he continued his collaboration being the editor in charge of the architecture section 'Gran Formato' (1998-2008).

"His architectural reportages, conceived as a narrative essay rather than a set of separate images, aim to convey to the observer a complex range of emotions, experiences and reflections, providing an exhaustive and multifaceted vision of the project. However, the main purpose of his visual research is to inspire and stimulate the spectator, rather than to transmit objective information about the intervention portrayed.".

Publications

References

External links 
 Duccio Malagamba Fotografía de Arquitectura - Official Homepage
 Interview with Duccio Malagamba in ArchDaily
 Duccio Malagamba in Plataforma de Arquitectura
 Duccio Malagamba’s interview for Vitruvius
 Selected Projects by Alvaro Siza in Dezeen
 Architectural Review: Duccio Malagamba navigates the vast lengths and breadths of Brasilia
 Photo reportage of Brasilia in Arcspace

Architectural photographers
Italian photographers
Living people
1960 births